Konstantinos "Kostas" Koufogiorgos (born 14 February 1972 in Arta, Greece) is a Greek-German political cartoonist and painter.

Biography 

While working as a cartoonist for several newspapers and magazines; Koufogiorgos began studying economics at the University of Athens in 1990. His first work of art was published in 1989 in the political magazine ODIGITIS. Kostas Koufogiorgos has worked for numerous political and business papers, as well as for more than 20 magazines in Greece. Until 2014 he worked for the Greek Newspaper Eleftherotypia. In 2008, he started to work for German media.

Today he is publishing his work in German daily newspapers, e.g. Handelsblatt, Magdeburger Volksstimme, Weser Kurier, Fuldaer Zeitung, Neue Osnabrücker Zeitung, Ruhrnachrichten, Mainpost, Freie Presse, Tageblatt (Luxemburg), as well as for online-platforms, e.g. web.de, gmx.de, MSN and magazines as Nebelspalter.

Kostas Koufogiorgos lives in Stuttgart-Bad Cannstatt.

Books 
 Frau Schächtele will oben bleiben. Children's book in cooperation with mit Monika Spang, Silberburg Verlag, Tübingen and Lahr/Schwarzwald 2011, 
 Minima Politika. Political Cartoons with lyrics by Wolfgang Bittner. Horlemann Verlag, Unkel (Germany) 2008, 
 Pano Kato. Elefsis, Tripolis (Greece) 2004, 
 ΜΕΡΕΣ ΚΡΙΣHΣ. Cartoons by Kostas Koufogiorgos and Vaggelis Papavasiliou published in Eleftherotypia 2013. Athens 2014
 S 21 Karikaturen Cartoons about the railway project Stuttgart 21. Stuttgart 2016
 2017 in bunten Bildern Cartoons of the Year 2017. Stuttgart 2017,  More Information koufogiorgos.de

Exhibitions

Cartoons 
 Group Exhibition, Bamberg (Germany), 2006-2010: "For heaven's sake: church in the caricature"
 Exhibition/Lecture, Stuttgart (Germany): "Minima Politika"; Political lyrics and caricatures. In cooperation with Wolfgang Bittner
 Group Exhibition, Berlin (Germany): January 22, 2009 - November 13, 2009:  "Rückblende" – Political Caricatures of the year 2008
 Group Exhibition, Berlin (Germany): January 28, 2010 - November 12, 2010:  "Rückblende" – Political Caricatures of the year 2009
 Group Exhibition, Berlin (Germany): January 21, 2011 - October 21, 2011:  "Rückblende" – Political Caricatures of the year 2010
 Group Exhibition, Berlin (Germany): January 27, 2012 - October 26, 2012:  "Rückblende" – Political Caricatures of the year 2011
 Group Exhibition, Stuttgart u. a.: 31 March 2012 - 15 May 2012: "Mit spitzer Feder" - German Award for political cartoons
 Group Exhibition, Berlin (Germany): January 30, 2014 - November 14, 2014:  "Rückblende" – Political Caricatures of the year 2013
 Group Exhibition, Potsdam: Karikaturenausstellung der Gemeinsamen Landesplanung Berlin-Brandenburg und Cartoonlobby e. V. "Grenzfälle-Nachbarn wie Du und ich" July 3, 2014 - September 12, 2014
 Group Exhibition, Luckau: "Lob des Kapitalismus...ein Versuch in Bildern". Cartoon Museum Brandenburg August 2, 2014 - October 26, 2014
 Group Exhibition, Berlin (Germany): January 28, 2015 - November 22, 2015:  "Rückblende" – Political Caricatures of the year 2014
 Group Exhibition, Berlin (Germany): January 27, 2016 - November 4, 2016:  "Rückblende" – Political Caricatures of the year 2015
 Group Exhibition, Celle u. a.: April 11, 2016 (ongoing): "Oh, eine Dummel!"-Rechtsextremismus und Menschenfeindlichkeit in Karikatur und Satire
 Group Exhibition, Berlin (Germany): January 24, 2017 - November 3, 2017:  "Rückblende" – Political Caricatures of the year 2016
 Exhibition, Sachsenheim: "Skizzophrenien" Cartoons by Kostas Koufogiorgos. Exhibition Museum of the City of Sachsenheim, June 17 - October 21, 2018. 
Exhibition, Bad Cannstatt: "KarikaturM" Karikaturenausstellung auf dem Cannstatter Stadtkirchenturm 20 July 2019 in Rahmen des Cannstatter Kulturmenues
 Group Exhibition, Berlin (Germany): January 28, 2020 – November 22, 2020: "Rückblende" – Political Caricatures of the year 2019
 Group Exhibition, Berlin (Germany): January 25, 2020 – November 26, 2020: "Rückblende" – Political Caricatures of the year 2020

Paintings 
 Exhibition, Korntal (Germany): May 25, 2007 - August 27, 2007: "Kostas Koufogiorgos-Paintings"
 Group Exhibition, Athens (Greece): February 18, 2009 - March 20, 2009: "The cartoonists are painting"

Awards 
 2012: Mit spitzer Feder" - German Award for political cartoons  
 2016: Mit spitzer Feder" - German Award for political cartoons "Mit spitzer Feder 2015"
 2016: 3rd Place International Day of Freedom of Press Contest 2016 
 2020: 3rd Place "Rückblende 2019": Der deutsche Preis für die politische Fotografie und Karikatur

References

External links 
 Kostas Koufogiorgos Homepage
 Interview with Kostas Koufogiorgos in Neue Rheinische Zeitung
 http://www.mitspitzerfeder.de
 "Alles ist Politik" Interview in Kontext: Wochenzeitung
  "Gute Karikaturen sind selten zum Lachen" Der Karikaturist Kostas Koufogiorgos im forumZFD-Interview
 Der Maler der Stadtkirche. Portrait der Cannstatter Zeitung, September 2020
  About Kostas Koufogiorgos Regio TV Stuttgart, 25th Februaray 2021

1972 births
Living people
People from Arta, Greece
Greek caricaturists